Exhibition railway station is located on the Exhibition line in Queensland, Australia. It serves the Brisbane Exhibition Ground in Bowen Hills and is normally only opened during the Ekka show each August.

Previously an extra ticket surcharge had to be paid to travel to the station. In 2009, TransLink CEO Peter Strachan blamed the surcharge on the Royal National Agricultural & Industrial Association not willing to pick up the cost of running the station. The surcharge was removed in 2012.

Because of the requirements of the Show, the station is equipped with facilities for dealing with livestock. The line passing through the station is regularly used by trains traveling between Roma Street station and Mayne depot.

Cross River Rail
Construction of the Cross River Rail project will see Exhibition Station upgraded for year-round operation and the development of a precinct between the station and the nearby RBWH.  The island platform will run for 165 metres in length, allowing it to provide for up to nine-car trains.

The tunnel portal for the Cross River Rail line will be located south of the Exhibition Station and the next station for southbound Cross River Rail services will be the underground Cross River Rail platforms at Roma Street.

References

External links

Exhibition station Queensland Rail
Exhibition station Queensland's Railways on the Internet

Railway stations in Brisbane